The Illinois Technology and Research Corridor is a region of commerce and industry located along Interstate 88 in the Chicago metropolitan area, primarily in DuPage, Kane, and DeKalb Counties.  The corridor is home to the headquarters or regional centers for many Fortune 1000 companies (including many specializing in research, development, logistics, and technology), several office and industrial parks, colleges and universities, research and scientific institutions, medical centers, government centers, and abundant shopping, dining, lodging, and entertainment amenities.  In addition to the I-90 Golden Corridor, the I-94 Lakeshore Corridor, and the I-55 Industrial Corridor, the Illinois Technology and Research Corridor is one of the principal economic centers in suburban Chicago.

History 
The first companies that formed the Illinois Technology and Research Corridor began locating in Naperville in the 1960s. In 1962, Northern Illinois Gas (now Nicor) moved its research and administrative facilities to Naperville in 1962, followed by Bell Laboratories (1964), and the Amoco Research Center (now BP) in 1969.

In Batavia, Fermilab was established as the National Accelerator Laboratory in 1967, with its particle accelerator becoming operational in 1972.

The Corridor Group was formed in 1982, with representation by over 80 high technology companies, national labs, associated industries, and colleges and universities.

Cities and villages
Cities and villages located partially or wholly within the scope of the Illinois Technology and Research Corridor include:

Aurora
Batavia
Campton Hills
Carol Stream
Clarendon Hills
Cortland
DeKalb
Downers Grove
Elburn
Elmhurst
Geneva
Glendale Heights
Glen Ellyn
Hinsdale
Kaneville
Lisle
Lombard

Malta
Maple Park
Montgomery
Naperville
North Aurora
Oak Brook
Oakbrook Terrace
St. Charles
Sugar Grove
Sycamore
Villa Park
Warrenville
Westchester
West Chicago
Westmont
Wheaton
Winfield
Woodridge

Companies

Major companies with a strong presence in the Illinois Technology and Research Corridor include:
Ace Hardware, a hardware store chain headquartered in Oak Brook
Acxiom, in Downers Grove, is a customer and data information management company
Aldi, a grocery store chain with US headquarters in Batavia
APL Logistics, a freight transportation company with offices in Oak Brook
Blistex, Incorporated, a personal care products company headquartered in Oak Brook
BP, an international energy company with its North American chemicals headquarters and research facilities in Naperville
Calamos, an asset management firm headquartered in Naperville
Caterpillar, a construction equipment manufacturer with a plant in Montgomery
ConAgra Foods, a packaged foods company with offices in Naperville
Coskata, Inc., an energy research company headquartered in Warrenville
Crowe LLP, a public accounting, consulting, and technology firm headquartered in Oakbrook Terrace
Devry University, an international technical college headquartered in Downers Grove
Dover Corporation, a manufacturer of specialized industrial products and equipment headquartered in Downers Grove
Eby-Brown, a wholesale distributor headquartered in Naperville
Exelon, a Fortune 100 energy company, has its Exelon Nuclear headquarters in Warrenville and offices for ComEd in Oakbrook Terrace
Farm Progress, an agricultural publication publisher headquartered in St. Charles
FGI Universal LLC, the largest frozen produce importer in the USA in Naperville
First Alert, a safety products company headquartered in Aurora
Hyundai, a motor vehicle company with regional offices in Aurora
Joint Commission, health institution or program accreditation agency headquartered in Oakbrook Terrace
MetLife, an insurance company with offices in Aurora
Microsoft a computer technology company with offices in Downers Grove
Mitutoyo, a company specializing in measuring instruments and metrological technology with U.S. headquarters in Aurora
Molex, an electronic components manufacturer headquartered in Lisle
Nalco, a water treatment and chemical company headquartered in Naperville
Navistar, an automotive manufacturer headquartered in Lisle
Nicor, a gas utility company headquartered in Naperville
Nissan Motors, an automotive manufacturer with offices in Aurora and Naperville
Nokia, an international telecommunications company, with offices in Naperville and Lisle.
Oberweis Dairy, a dairy products company headquartered in North Aurora
Portillo's Restaurants, a restaurant chain headquartered in Oakbrook Terrace
Redbox a media rental company headquartered in Oakbrook Terrace
Sanford L.P., a writing products manufacturer headquartered in Oak Brook
SAP America, the Americas' subsidiary of SAP AG, the world's largest business software company with offices in Downers Grove.
Sara Lee, a food company headquartered in Downers Grove
Smithfield Foods, a meat products manufacturer with subsidiary Armour-Eckrich Meats headquartered in Lisle and a processing facility in St. Charles
Sunshine Biscuits, a cracker, cookie, and cereal manufacturer headquartered in Elmhurst
Tellabs, a telecommunications company headquartered in Naperville
Toyota Motor Sales, U.S.A., Inc., an automobile manufacturer with regional offices in Aurora and Naperville
VVF, a personal care products manufacturer with a plant in Montgomery
Westell, a modems manufacturer headquartered in Aurora

Higher education institutions

Aurora University is a private liberal arts college located in Aurora
Benedictine University a private university located in Lisle
The College of DuPage is a community college that primarily serves DuPage County, located in Glen Ellyn
DeVry University, headquartered in Oakbrook Terrace, offers numerous technical degrees at its eight Chicago area campuses.
Elmhurst College is a private liberal arts college in Elmhurst
Illinois Institute of Technology, with a campus in Wheaton, offers three degree programs in Information Technology and Management.
Kishwaukee College is a community college that primarily serves DeKalb County, in Malta
Midwestern University, a private graduate and professional school of health sciences in Downers Grove
National-Louis University is a private Chicago-based university with a campus in Lisle
North Central College is a private liberal arts college located in Naperville
Northern Illinois University, is a public university and research institution located in DeKalb.  It is the second largest institution of higher education in the state of Illinois in terms of enrollment. A satellite campus is located in Naperville.
Waubonsee Community College is a community college that primarily serves central & southern Kane County and northern Kendall County, in Sugar Grove
Wheaton College is a private liberal arts college in Wheaton

Research institutions

The only multipurpose national laboratory in the Midwest, Argonne manages and operates a range of scientific user facilities, including the Advanced Photon Source, the Center for Nanoscale Materials and the Argonne Leadership Computing Facility. Argonne's annual budget is $650 million and employs 3,500 people. It is owned by the Department of Energy and operated by UChicago Argonne LLC.
It is home to the world's former highest energy particle accelerator, Tevatron. The accelerator was built in 1983 at a cost of $120 million, and was upgraded in 1994 at a cost of $290 million. It employs 2,100 people.

Medical centers

 Adventist GlenOaks Hospital, in Glendale Heights
 Adventist Hinsdale Hospital, in Hinsdale
 Advocate Good Samaritan Hospital, in Downers Grove
 Central DuPage Hospital, in Winfield
 Delnor Community Hospital, in Geneva
 Edward Hospital, in Naperville
 Elmhurst Memorial Hospital, in Elmhurst
 Kishwaukee Community Hospital, in DeKalb
 Provena Mercy Medical Center, in Aurora
 Rush-Copley Medical Center, in Aurora

Government centers
DeKalb County Government Center and Courthouse, located in Sycamore
DuPage County Government Center, Judicial Center, and Fairgrounds, located in Wheaton
Kane County Government Center and Courthouse, located in Geneva
Kane County Judicial Center and Fairgrounds, located in St. Charles

Shopping centers

Cantera, an open-air shopping, dining, and entertainment complex located in Warrenville
Chicago Premium Outlets, an outlet mall located in Aurora
Geneva Commons, an upscale, open-air lifestyle center located in Geneva
Oakbrook Center, a regional upscale, open-air shopping mall located in Oak Brook.  It is the largest open-air shopping center in the contiguous United States.
Town Square Wheaton, an upscale open-air shopping center located in Wheaton
Westfield Fox Valley, a regional enclosed shopping mall located in Aurora
Yorktown Center, a regional enclosed shopping mall located in Lombard

Points of interest

The Air Classics Museum, an aviation museum at Aurora Municipal Airport in Sugar Grove
The Arcada Theater, a historic theater in downtown St. Charles
Blackberry Farm, an historical farmstead in Aurora
Cantigny, a large park with historical museums and gardens, in Wheaton
The Convocation Center, a 10,000-seat arena on the campus of Northern Illinois University in DeKalb
Drury Lane Theatre, a theater and dining center in Oakbrook Terrace
The DuPage Children's Museum, a museum and interactive learning center in downtown Naperville
The Egyptian Theatre, an historic theater in downtown DeKalb
Elfstrom Stadium, a minor league ballpark, home to the Kane County Cougars, located in Geneva
The Ellwood House, a historical museum in DeKalb
The Glidden House, a historical museum in DeKalb
The Grand Theatre, an historical theater in downtown Wheaton
The Gurler House, a historical museum in DeKalb
Hollywood Casino, a casino in downtown Aurora
Huskie Stadium, a 30,000-seat football stadium located on the campus of Northern Illinois University in DeKalb
Morton Arboretum, a botanical garden located in Lisle
The Naperville Riverwalk, a riverwalk and park located in downtown Naperville along the DuPage River.  The area is also home to the Centennial Beach recreational area and the iconic Moser Tower
Oakbrook Terrace Tower, a 31-story office building located in Oakbrook Terrace.  It is the tallest building in suburban Chicago.
The Paramount Theatre, an historic theater located in downtown Aurora
Pheasant Run and the Q Center, convention centers located in St. Charles
Phillips Park Zoo, a zoological park featuring native species located in Aurora
The Tivoli Theatre, an historic theater in downtown Downers Grove
Two Brothers Roundhouse, an historic roundhouse, museum, and dining center located in downtown Aurora

See also
Golden Corridor
Lakeshore Corridor
List of technology centers
List of edge cities

References

Chicago metropolitan area
Geography of Cook County, Illinois
Geography of DeKalb County, Illinois
Geography of DuPage County, Illinois
Economy of Illinois
High-technology business districts in the United States
Geography of Kane County, Illinois
Edge cities in the Chicago metropolitan area